The association football tournament at the 2014 South American Games was held from 7 March to 18 March in Santiago, Chile.

Medal summary

Medal table

Men's football

Group A

Group B

Semi-finals

Bronze-medal match

Gold-medal match

Women's football

Group A

Group B

Semi-finals

Bronze-medal match

Gold-medal match

References

Football
2014 in South American football
2014
2014
2014 in women's association football